Viaducto is a station on Line 2 of the Mexico City Metro system. It is located in the border of Benito Juárez and Iztacalco boroughs of Mexico City, south of the city centre on Calzada de Tlalpan. It is a surface station.

General information
It is represented by the stylised logo of a cloverleaf interchange, which represents crossing of Calzada de Tlalpan (a former Aztec road) and Viaducto Miguel Alemán, a crosscutting freeway that runs across the middle of the Federal District which opened in September 1950.  The station was opened on 1 August 1970.

Ridership

Train crash
On October 20, 1975, at about 09:40 local time (15:40 GMT), two trains crashed, while both were going towards Tasqueña station. The first was parked at Viaducto station picking up passengers when it was hit by another train that did not stop in time. According to official reports, from 31 to 39 people died, and between 71 and 119 were injured. To date, it is the worst railroad accident recorded in the Mexico City Metro. The driver, Carlos Fernández, was found guilty and sentenced to 12 years in prison. After the crash, automatic traffic lights were incorporated to all lines.

Exits
East: Calzada de Tlalpan between Coruña street and Calzada Santa Anita, Colonia Viaducto Piedad
West: Calzada de Tlalpan between Coruña street and Segovia street, Colonia Álamos

See also
 List of Mexico City metro stations
 2020 Mexico City Metro train crash
 2023 Mexico City Metro train crash

References

External links

Viaducto
Railway stations opened in 1970
1970 establishments in Mexico
Mexico City Metro stations in Benito Juárez, Mexico City
Mexico City Metro stations in Iztacalco